"Don't Worry" is a song by Swedish singer Ace Wilder. The song was released in Sweden as a digital download on 28 February 2016, and was written by Wilder along with Joy Deb, Linnea Deb, Anton Hård af Segerstad, and Behshad Ashnai. It took part in Melodifestivalen 2016, and qualified to the final from the first semi-final. It placed third in the final.

Track listing

Chart performance

Release history

References

2015 songs
2016 singles
Ace Wilder songs
English-language Swedish songs
Melodifestivalen songs of 2016
Songs written by Anton Hård af Segerstad
Songs written by Joy Deb
Songs written by Linnea Deb
Songs written by Ace Wilder